The Publisher Item Identifier (PII) is a unique identifier used by a number of scientific journal publishers to identify documents. It uses the pre-existing ISSN or ISBN of the publication in question, and adds a character for source publication type, an item number, and a check digit.

The system was adopted in 1996 by the American Chemical Society, the
American Institute of Physics, the American Physical Society,
Elsevier Science, and the IEEE.

Format
A PII (pii) is a 17-character string, consisting of:
 one character to indicate source publication type: "S" = serial with ISSN, "B" = book with ISBN
 ISSN (8 digits) or ISBN (10 characters) of the serial or book to which the publication item is primarily assigned
 in the case of serials an additional two digit number to pad the difference between the 8-digit ISSN and an ISBN (suggested are the last two digits of calendar year of the date of assignment, which is not necessarily identical to the cover date)
 a 5-digit number assigned by the publisher that is unique to the publication item within the serial or book
 a check digit (0-9 or X)
When a PII is printed (as opposed to stored in a database), the 17-character string may be extended with punctuation characters to make it more readable to humans, as in Sxxxx-xxxx(yy)iiiii-d or Bx-xxx-xxxxx-x/iiiii-d.

Example

See also 
 Serial Item and Contribution Identifier (SICI)
 Digital Object Identifier (DOI)
 OpenURL
 Template:PII

References

External links 
 Document identifiers: an update on current activities

Identifiers